CTIA may refer to:

 Color Television Interface Adaptor, a custom chip inside early Atari 8-bit computers
 CTIA (organization), a trade association representing the wireless communications industry in the United States
 Cape Town International Airport